Erik Gustaf Geijer (12 January 1783 – 23 April 1847) was a Swedish writer, historian, poet, romantic critic of political economy, philosopher, and composer. His writings served to promote Swedish National Romanticism.  He was an influential advocate of conservatism, but switched to liberalism later in life.

Biography
Geijer was born at Geijersgården, his family's estate in Ransäter, Värmland. He was educated at the gymnasium of Karlstad and then attended the University of Uppsala, where he earned his master's degree in 1806. In 1803 he had competed successfully for an historical prize offered by the Academy of Sciences at Stockholm.  In 1809, he traveled in England. The year following, he became a lecturer in history at Uppsala, and in 1815 assistant to Eric Michael Fant.  Succeeding Fant, Geijer was a professor of history from 1817 at Uppsala University where a statue now commemorates him.  He was rector of Uppsala University during the years 1822, 1830, 1836 and 1843–1844. As a representative of the university, he was a member of the Church of Sweden clergy in the Riksdag of the Estates in 1828–1830 and 1840–1841. He was a member of the Swedish Academy (on seat 14) from 1824. He was a member of the education committee from 1825 to 1828. In 1830 he joined Pro Fide et Christianismo, a Christian education society. In 1835, he became a member of the Royal Swedish Academy of Sciences.

Geijer was also a founding member of the Geatish Society. In the first issue of its periodical, Iduna, appeared Geijer's most famous poem The Viking, which described the Vikings as the heroic Norsemen that people might imagine today, and was a turning-point in the rehabilitation of Norse culture among the Swedish people. Geijer collaborated with Arvid August Afzelius, in the three volume collection of Swedish folk-songs, Svenska folk-visor från forntiden (Stockholm, 1814–1816).

Geijer was a noted historian, although he did not complete any one of the vast undertakings which he planned. Of the Records of Sweden, which were to have embraced the history of his native country from mythical ages to his own times, he finished only the introductory volume. His Svenska folkets historia (3 vols., 1832–36), which was intended to form one of the series of European histories edited by Leo and Ukert, was not carried beyond the abdication of Queen Christina (1654), the reason probably being the author's conversion to liberalism in history and politics. It has been suggested, however, that Geijer's declaring for liberalism was perhaps as much coming-out-of-the-closet as it was a true conversion. Incomplete as they are, these works are highly regarded contributions to Swedish history. His History of the Swedes down to Charles X was translated into English by Turner, with biographical introduction (London, 1845).

Geijer was entrusted the task of examining and editing the papers which Gustavus III had bequeathed to the University of Uppsala, with the stipulation that they were not to be opened for fifty years after his death. In fulfillment of his charge, Geijer arranged these papers in a work which appeared in 1843-45 under the title of Gusstaf III's efterlemnade papper, but they contained little or nothing of value.

Although he rose to fame as a nationalist author, Geijer's views changed during his lifetime. During the last ten years of his life, he took an active part in politics, and began to advocate social reform and Liberalism. Although his political writings possess great merit, the very versatility of his powers diverted him from applying them methodically to the complete elaboration of any one subject.

In 1846 increasing ill health forced him to resign his position as professor at Uppsala. He died in Stockholm. He left some personal memoirs, Minnen (Upsala, 1834). His collected works, Samlade Skrifter, with a bibliographic treatise by Teodblad (8 vols.), appeared at Stockholm (1873–75).

Geijersgården

Geijersgården is a historic mansion in the centre of Uppsala, north of the University library. Geijersgården is named after Erik Gustaf Geijer, who lived there from 1837 to 1846.   The main building was built between 1737 and 1738.  The estate gained its present appearance around 1850.

In 1934, the estate was taken over by Uppsala University and since 1965 has housed the Dag Hammarskjöld Foundation (Hammarskjöldfonden). The building was restored in the 1983 after a fire in which the building's western parts were badly damaged.  The buildings are classified as historic properties under the Swedish Cultural Monuments Act (Kulturminneslagen).

Selected works
Om falsk och sann upplysning med avseende på religionen (1811)
Thorild: Tillika en filosofisk eller ofilosofisk bekännelse (1820)
Svea rikes häfder (1825)
Svenska folkets historia, I-III, 1832–36
Minnen (1834)
Freedom in Sweden: Selected works of Erik Gustaf Geijer (2017)

Musical works

Chamber music
Violin Sonata in G minor, 1819
Violin Sonata in D minor
Violin Sonata in F
Violin Sonata in A♭
Sonatine for cello and piano, 1838?
Piano trio in A♭
Piano Quartet in E minor, 1825, published 1865
Piano Quintet in F minor, 1823
String Quartet in F, 1830s
String Quartet in B, 1846–47

Piano
Piano sonata in G minor, 1810
Fantasi in F minor, 1810
Divertimento, 1824
Midnattsfantasi, 1833
Scherzo, 1838
Aftonstunder for piano, 1840
Double sonata E♭ for four-hands, one piano, 1819
Double sonata F minor for four-hands, one piano, published 1820.

Songs
(to his own words unless otherwise stated)
Sångstycken med ackompagnement för Piano-forte (1834)
Söderländskan i Norden ; I en ung flickas album ; Blomplockerskan ; Bilden ; Tonerna ; De små (duet) ; Höstvisa (duet) ; Soldatflickorna (duet)
Nya sånger med ackompanjement för piano-forte (1836)
Vårsång (trio) ; Den första sommarfläkten (trio) ; I dansen (duett) ; På sjön (a cappella choir) ; Avsked med eko (a cappella choir) ; Aftonkänsla (a cappella choir) ; Skärsliparegossen ; Reseda ; Ur dansen
Nyare sånger till forte-piano (1837)
Barndomsminnen ; Min hustrus visa ; Gräl och allt väl ; Min music ; Vallflickans aftonvisa ; Första aftonen i det nya hemmet ("Jag vet en hälsning mera kär") ; Husarbrudarna (duet) ; Marsch ("För Gud och sanning") (men's chorus)
Gammalt och nytt. Sånger för forte-piano. (1838)
Spinnerskorna (duet) ; På nyårsdagen ; Den lilla kolargossen (The Little Charcoal-burner) ; Riddar Toggenborg ; Anderöst (Per Daniel Amadeus Atterbom) ; From Lidner's Medea (I) and (II) (Bengt Lidner) ; Den slumrande lilla flickan (Carl Wilhelm Böttiger)
Sånger till forte-piano. 5:e häftet. (1839)
Vår och saknad (duet) ; Kom! Farväl! (duet) ; Anna (duet) ; Den femtiosjätte födelsedagen ; Kommer ej våren ; Salongen och skogen ; Sångerskan ; Flicktankar ; Gondolieren
Sånger till forte-piano. 6:e häftet. (1840)
Aftonklockan ; Natthimmelen (The Night Sky) ; Höstsädet ; Min politik (My politics) ; Tal och tystnad (Speech and Silence, 1838); På vattnet ; Studentsång ("Fädernesland, vars härliga minnen") (men's chorus) ; Aftonbetraktelse (mixed choir) (Carl Wilhelm Böttiger)
Sånger till forte-piano. 7:e häftet. (1841)
Flickorna (duet) ; På dagen av mitt silverbröllop (duet) ; Afton på sjön (duet) ; På en väns födelsedag (duet) ; På en resa i hembygden ; Vallgossens visa ; Juldagen 1840 ; Vad jag älskar ; Stjärnglansen
Sånger till forte-piano. 8:e häftet. (1842)
Det fordna hemmet ; Mod och försakelse (1839, for Jenny Lind) ; Till min dotter ; Sparvens visa ; Vid en väns tillfrisknande ; Den sörjandes morgon ; Avskedet ; Han ; Det sextionde året (duet) ; Aftonen (trio) ; Solens nedgång i havet (mixed choir)
Sånger till forte-piano. 9:e häftet. (1846)
Den enfaldiga visan ; Arbetarens visa ; Skridskovisa ; Den nalkande stormen ; Två sånger utan ord (piano)

Other vocal works
Musik för sång och för fortepiano (with Adolf Fredrik Lindblad (1824)
Thekla. Eine Geisterstimme. (Friedrich von Schiller)
Till en liten flicka med en guldkjed 
Svanhvits sång (Per Daniel Amadeus Atterbom)
Nya märkvärdigheter (after Friedrich von Schiller) (men's choir)
Nähe des Geliebten (Johann Wolfgang von Goethe)
Aftonstunder vid piano-forte tillegnade min dotter (1840)
Tillegnan
Bragurmannen (songs by Geijer, Adolf Fredrik Lindblad and Johan Erik Nordblom) (1845)
Tålamod
Harmoniens makt (duet)
Other songs
Vikingen (The Viking, 1811) ; Odalbonden ; Den siste skalden ; Aftonbön på Ransberg ; Majbetraktelser ; Emma (Johan Olof Wallin) ; Förgät mig ej (possibly Geijer's last song, 1846, published in Nordstjernan, 1847) ; Skaldens farväl ; Mignon
Other duets
Berg och dal ; Slädfarten ; Vid en väns tillfrisknande (duet version) ; Kärleken på resan genom lifvet
Other trios
Mor och dotter ; Natt-tankar (1841) ; Afskedssång (1846) ; Schneiderschreck (Johann Wolfgang von Goethe)

Other works for mixed choir
Minne och hopp
Var lyckan bor
1841
Varning, hopp och bön
Serenad (Serenata)

Other works for men's choir
Svanhvits sång
Studentmarsch ("Att älska Gud, kung, Fädernesland")
Till mina vänner
Vandrar du än

References

Other sources

Brief biographical treatises were written by Malmstroem (Upsala, 1848), Fries (Stockholm, 1849), and Carlson (Stockholm, 1870).

 Andræ, Carl Goran (1983) Siare och nationalmonument: Historikern Erik Gustaf Geijer, 1783-1847 (Almqvist & Wiksell) 
 Ehnmark, Anders   (1999)  Minnets hemlighet: En bok om Erik Gustaf Geijer  (Norstedts) 
 Erdmann, Nils Axel Fredrik (2010)  Erik Gustaf Geijer: En Minnesteckning  (Nabu Press) 
 Lönnroth, Lars (2019) Geijerarvet. En släkthistoria om dikt och galenskap (Atlantis)
 Olsson,  Bernt and  Ingemar Algulin (1991) Litteraturens historia i Sverige (Stockholm) 
 Thorsoe, Alexander (2010) Erik Gustaf Geijers Forelaesninger Over Menniskans Historia  (Kessinger Publishing)

External links

Geijer website
Hammarskjöldfonden

1783 births
1847 deaths
19th-century classical composers
People from Munkfors Municipality
Writers from Värmland
Swedish classical composers
Swedish male classical composers
Swedish educators
Swedish folk-song collectors
Swedish-language writers
Swedish philosophers
Swedish male poets
Swedish male writers
Romantic composers
Uppsala University alumni
Members of the Swedish Academy
Members of the Royal Swedish Academy of Sciences
19th-century Swedish historians
19th-century Swedish poets
19th-century male writers
Burials at Uppsala old cemetery
Swedish translators
English–Swedish translators
19th-century male musicians
19th-century translators
Romantic critics of political economy
Members of the Riksdag of the Estates
Erik Gustaf